Ololygon v-signata is a species of frog in the family Hylidae.
It is endemic to Brazil.
Its natural habitats are subtropical or tropical moist lowland forests and subtropical or tropical moist montane forests.
It is threatened by habitat loss.

References

Endemic fauna of Brazil
Amphibians described in 1968
Taxonomy articles created by Polbot